Foreign relations of Qatar is conducted through its Ministry of Foreign Affairs. Arab states were among the first to recognize Qatar, and the country gained admittance to the United Nations and the Arab League after achieving independence in 1971. The country was an early member of OPEC and a founding member of the Gulf Cooperation Council (GCC). Diplomatic missions to Qatar are based in its capital, Doha.

Qatar’s regional relations and foreign policies are characterized by strategy of balancing and alliance building among regional and great powers. It maintains independent foreign policy and engages in regional balancing to secure its strategic priorities and to have recognition on the regional and international level. As a small state in the gulf, Qatar has an "open-door" foreign policy where Qatar maintain ties to all parties and regional players in the region, including with organizations such as Taliban and Hamas.

Qatar's state-funded news media company Al Jazeera serves as a means of exerting international soft power.

Multilateral relations
Sheikh Hamad bin Khalifa Al Thani, the emir of Qatar from 1995 to 2013, helped establish Qatar's reputation as an influential player in Middle East politics. The first major move in this regard was the founding of Al Jazeera, a state-owned news media company.

Qatar has also cultivated close relationships with Western powers, particularly the United States and the United Kingdom. Al Udeid Air Base hosts American and British air forces. Qatar has invested extensively in London real estate, and the country has also made donations to prominent research centers in the United States. At the same time, Qatar maintains ties to Western adversaries, including Iran, Hamas, the Muslim Brotherhood, and extremist elements in Syria. Although according to a report by the economist in December 2021, Qatar has modified its anti-Islamist policies and demanded Brotherhood activists to leave from the nation.

Qatar has a population of around 1.8 million people, however only 280,000 of these are citizens. The vast majority of the population are migrant labourers who suffer severe human rights abuses including unfit living conditions, abuse by employers, and seizure of passports and other immigration documents. These human rights abuses have caused tensions between Qatar and liberal western democracies. It is also one of the few countries in which citizens do not have to pay any taxes. On October 16, 2019, the Council of Ministers of the State of Qatar unanimously endorsed end to such practice in the country by abolishment of the Kafala system. On 20 March 2021, Qatar's new non-discriminatory minimum wage law that guaranteed the same minimum wage for all workers, all nationalities, all sectors including the domestic workers, came into force. The law also ensured a minimum monthly wage of QAR1,000 ($275) and minimum allowances for food (QAR300) and housing (QAR500) to the workers.

Qatar buys influence in Western countries through investments and donations. For example, the country has made large donations to the prominent Washington-based think tank the Brookings Institution, purchased British retailer Harrods, and donated $1 million to the Clinton Foundation while Hillary Clinton was U.S. Secretary of State. Qatar is a strategic ally of China, with relationship between the two countries growing stronger.

Qatar is a member of Organisation of Islamic Cooperation, Gulf Cooperation Council, OPEC and the Council of Arab Economic Unity.

Regional relations
According to journalist Elizabeth Dickinson, Qatar is seeking to become a major regional player in Middle East politics. She has argued that Qatar aimed to do the same in the Syrian Civil War, and has provided support to extremist elements in Syria. According to Dickinson, Qatar and Saudi Arabia are competing for influence in regional politics.

In September, 2014. QFFD contributed in enhancing stability for Syrian refugees. Qatar Charity facilitated access to quality education through the rehabilitation of 6 Formal schools in Turkey, Gaziantep, Urfa, Kilis, targeting a total number of 13,540 beneficiaries and 12,860 girls and boys.

Qatar has been influential in political and religious upheavals in the Middle East. Qatar supported several rebel groups during the Arab Spring financially and by asserting global influence through its expanding news group, Al Jazeera. During the Arab Spring, Qatar moved away from its traditional foreign policy role as diplomatic mediator to accept change in the Middle East and North Africa and support transitioning states.

Qatar's support for the Muslim Brotherhood and allied groups throughout the Middle East, as well as positions taken by Al Jazeera have led to increasing tensions with other Gulf States. On 5 March 2014, Saudi Arabia, the UAE, and Bahrain withdrew their ambassadors from Qatar in protest at what they claimed was Qatar's non-compliance with a November 2013 agreement not to "interfere" in countries' internal affairs.

However, On July 10 2017 according to documents obtained by Al Arabiya, Qatar agreed to quit supporting the Muslim Brotherhood. In order to avoid undermining relations with the Gulf, it also removed non-citizens from Qatar and refused to provide shelter to anyone from a GCC nation. On March 27 2022, The United Nations Office of Counter-Terrorism (UNOCT) and Qatar on their fourth high-level strategic discussion, discussed strategic priorities and worked together to ensure that the UN effectively supports member states in their efforts to combat terrorism. Out of a total of 35 other contributors, the state of Qatar is the second greatest contributor to the UN trust fund for counter-terrorism.

Some financial economists have interpreted the 2014 Saudi-Qatari rift as the tangible political sign  of a growing economic rivalry between oil and natural gas producers, which could “have deep and long-lasting consequences” beyond the Middle East.

In March 2014 Qatar made overtures to Oman in order to counteract the influence of Saudi Arabia on politics in the region.

In May 2017, an alleged hack of state media led to stories quoting the Emir as enquiring US resentment towards Iran and remarking on Hamas. Doha reported it as false and gave no indication on where it originated. However, news organizations in the region reported the emir's comments as fact. This led to Saudi Arabia, UAE, Egypt and Bahrain cutting diplomatic ties with Qatar on 5 June 2017.

Qatar voiced support for the Turkish invasion of northern Syria aimed at ousting U.S.-backed Syrian Kurds from the enclave of Afrin. Spokeswoman of Ministry of Foreign Affairs, Lulwah Rashif Al-Khater said that: "The launching of the Turkish military operation last Saturday was motivated by legitimate concerns related to its national security and the security of its borders, in addition to protecting Syria's territorial integrity from the danger of secession. Turkey, a NATO member, has always been a stabilizing factor in the region."

Peace brokering and peacekeeping activities

The onset of the Arab Spring in January 2011 complicated Qatar's ability to mediate having forced Gulf leaders to side with revolutionaries or the longstanding autocratic regimes. Sheikh Hamad stated in that Qatar would support the uprisings, a position that clashed with neighboring Saudi Arabia and the United Arab Emirates. Qatar provided extensive support, in funding and weapons, to Libyan revolutionaries and aided in the removal of Muammar Gaddafi by mobilising Arab support behind NATO airstrikes. In Egypt, Qatar supported President Mohamed Morsi and has suffered from strained relations with President Abdel Fattah el-Sisi following Morsi's removal. In Syria, Qatar has provided arms and funding to various opposition groups.

Starting in 2013 Qatar was accused of financing Islamic extremists in Syria, a charge which has been refuted by Emir Sheikh Tamim on CNN and by Foreign Minister Khaled Al-Attiyah in an opinion piece in the British newspaper The Daily Telegraph. According to the Royal United Services Institute, Qatar plays an important role in Syria and Iraq as an interlocutor between Western powers and resistant groups that cannot be engaged directly. This role is consistent with Qatar's efforts as an interlocutor with the Taliban in Afghanistan, hosting a small Embassy in Doha where US officials are able to meet with the Taliban behind closed doors.

Prior to the abdication of Emir Sheikh Hamad, Qatar's mediation was fronted by the Qatari Minister of State for Foreign Affairs Ahmad Abdullah Al Mahmud. On 4 May 2009, the Qatari Minister of State for Foreign Affairs Ahmad Abdullah Al Mahmud announced that Chad and Sudan had agreed to end hostilities against each other and to normalize relations during Qatari-mediated talks in Doha; however the agreement quickly broke down. Qatar also brokered an agreement between the Sudanese government and the strongest Darfur rebel group, the Justice and Equality Movement, in Doha in February 2010. The agreement fell apart in May 2010 and the conflict is ongoing.

Qatar hosted a donors conference to help rebuild war-ravaged Darfur in April 2013.

In June 2010, Qatari peacekeeping forces deployed in the disputed Ras Doumeira area on the border between Djibouti and Eritrea after the latter withdrew from the area. The intention was to help start bilateral negotiations and solve the territorial dispute which had turned violent. Qatar withdrew its 450 troops from the Djibouti-Eritrea border in June 2017 after the two countries severed ties with Qatar.

Cultural and religious activities 
In a controversial bidding process marred by bribery and corruption scandals, Qatar was selected to host the 2022 FIFA World Cup. Qatar will be the first Middle Eastern country to host the popular international sporting event. Qatar-funded Qatar Airways has gone on an aggressive expansion campaign by competing with nearby Emirates Airline to reach more destinations and serve more passengers.

The sixty-sixth session of the United Nations General Assembly was presided over by former permanent representative of Qatar to the UN Nassir Abdulaziz Al-Nasser. The country has not accepted compulsory International Court of Justice jurisdiction.

In September 2013, Qatar funded 70% of a US$16 million mosque to be built in Slovenia (the only mosque in that country). It is due for completion in 2016. Due to its natural resource revenue and low indigenous population, Qatar has been able to take bold moves in expanding its global presence, particularly its regional role following the Arab Spring funding the oppositions in the Libyan Civil War and the Syrian civil war, as well as the Islamist government of Egypt (which was opposed by other fellow GCC states).

Foreign aid

Qatar’s international aid program has expanded dramatically since the beginning of 2010, and focuses heavily on the Arab world, most notably in the humanitarian crises in Syria and Gaza.

According to the UN OCHA’s Financial Tracking Service, Qatar’s international aid increased from less than $10 million annually in the pre-Arab Spring period to the hundreds of millions following the event.

For example in 2012, according to the Qatari Ministry of Foreign Affairs, the country donated more than QAR3 billion (or c. £524 million) through governmental and non-governmental aid to nearly 100 countries across the globe.

Qatari leadership has since pledged publicly to reduce suffering of victims and to achieve and support global partnerships for the achievement of foreign countries’ Millennium Development Goals. The state is engaged in investments in a wide range of humanitarian and developmental sectors.

Bilateral relations 
List of countries which Qatar maintains diplomatic relations with:

Africa

Americas

Asia

Europe

Oceania

See also
 List of diplomatic missions in Qatar
 List of diplomatic missions of Qatar
 Territorial disputes in the Persian Gulf
 Visa requirements for Qatari citizens

References

External links
 Ministry of Foreign Affairs of Qatar
 Foreign embassies in Qatar
 Qatar Digital Library - an online portal providing access to British Library archive materials relating to Gulf history